Eduardo De Filippo (24 May 1900 – 31 October 1984), also known simply as Eduardo, was an Italian actor, director, screenwriter and playwright, best known for his Neapolitan works Filumena Marturano and Napoli Milionaria. Considered one of the most important Italian artists of the 20th century, De Filippo was the author of many theatrical dramas staged and directed by himself first and later awarded and played outside Italy. For his artistic merits and contributions to Italian culture, he was named senatore a vita by the President of the Italian Republic Sandro Pertini.

Biography 

De Filippo was born in Naples from the affair between playwright and actor Eduardo Scarpetta and theatre seamstress and costumier Luisa De Filippo. He was the second of three children born from the couple, the other two being Annunziata "Titina" and Giuseppe "Peppino". His father was actually married since 1876 to Rosa De Filippo, Luisa's paternal aunt. His father Eduardo had several other illegitimate children from various affairs (including actors Ernesto Murolo, Eduardo Passarelli and Pasquale De Filippo). He began acting at the age of five and in 1932 formed a theater company  with his brother Peppino and sister Titina, called compagnia del Teatro Umoristico I De Filippo. Peppino left the troupe in 1944 and Titina departed by the early 1950s. After the war, in 1948 he bought the S. Ferdinando theatre in Naples, inaugurated in 1954.
De Filippo starred in De Sica's L'oro di Napoli with Totò and Sophia Loren in 1954. In 1973, Franco Zeffirelli's  production of De Filippo's 1959 play Sabato, domenica e lunedi (translated as Saturday, Sunday, Monday), starring Joan Plowright, Frank Finlay and Laurence Olivier, was presented at London's National Theatre and won the London drama critics' award.

He was married three times. His first wife was Dorothy Pennington. From his second wife, the actress Thea Prandi, he had two children: Luisa "Luisella" and Luca. The couple divorced in 1959. His daughter Luisella died aged 10 in 1960, shortly before her mother's death in 1961. His third wife was writer and playwright Isabella Quarantotti. The actress Angelica Ippolito is his step-daughter, born to Isabella Quarantotti and her first husband, the scientist Felice Ippolito.

De Filippo died of kidney failure on 31 October 1984, in Rome, at the age of 84. His artistic legacy was inherited by his son Luca.

Works

Theatre 

Farmacia di turno (The All-night Chemist, 1920)
Uomo e galantuomo (Man and Gentleman, 1922)
*Requie a l'anema soja/I morti non fanno paura (May his soul rest, 1926)
Ditegli sempre di sì (Always tell him "yes", 1927)
Filosoficamente (Philosophically, 1928)
Sik-sik, l'artefice magico (Sik-sik the magical maker, 1929)
Chi è cchiu' felice 'e me (Who's Happier than Me?, 1929)
Quei figuri di trent'anni fa (Those Dudes of 30 Years Ago, 1929)
Ogni anno punto e da capo (Every Year Back from the Start, 1931)
È arrivato 'o trentuno (The 31st is Here, 1931)
Natale in casa Cupiello (Christmas at the Cupiello's, 1931)
La voce del padrone/Il successo del giorno (Success of the Day, 1932)
Napoli milionaria (The Millions of Naples, 1945)
Filumena Marturano (1946)
Questi fantasmi (These Ghosts, 1946)
Le voci di dentro (Inner Voices, 1948)
La grande magia (The Great Magic, 1948)
La paura numero uno (The Greatest Fear, 1950)
Mia famiglia (Family of Mine, 1955)
Bene mio e core mio (My Heart, my Treasure, 1955)
De Pretore Vincenzo (Vincent De Pretore, 1957)
Sabato, domenica e lunedì (Saturday, Sunday and Monday, 1959)
Il sindaco del rione Sanità (Mayor of "Sanità" alley, 1961)
L'arte della commedia' ("The Art of Comedy", 1964)Il monumento (The Monument 1970)Gli esami non finiscono mai (Exams never end, 1973)

 Filmography Three Lucky Fools (1933) – Gilberto, l'impresarioThe Three-Cornered Hat (1935) – Don Teofilo, il governatoreThose Two (1935) – Il professoreIt Was I! (1937) – Giovannino ApicellaUna Commedia fra i pazzi (1937)L'amor mio non muore! (1938) – Lorenzo, il finanziere
 The Marquis of Ruvolito (1939) – Il marchese di RuvolitoIn the Country Fell a Star (1939) – Pasquale MontuoriIl sogno di tutti (1940) – Il professore scienziatoA che servono questi quattrini? (1942) – Il marchese Eduardo ParascandoloNon ti pago! (1942) – Don Ferdinando QuaglioloAfter Casanova's Fashion (1942) – Don FerdinandoNon mi muovo! (1943) – Don Carlo MezzettiIl fidanzato di mia moglie (1943) – Gaspare BelliniTi conosco, mascherina! (I know you, little Mask!, 1943) – CarmineLife Begins Anew (1945) – Il professoreUno tra la folla (1946) – Paolo BianchiAssunta Spina (1948) – Michele BoccadifuocoAlarm Bells (1949) – Don AndreaYvonne of the Night (1949) – L'avvocato RubiniNapoli milionaria (The Millions of Naples, 1950) – Gennaro IovineCameriera bella presenza offresi... (1951) – Raffaele, il professore di matematicaFilumena Marturano (1951) – Domenico SorianoThree Girls from Rome (1952) – VittorioUn Ladro in paradiso (1952)I sette peccati capitali ( Seven Deadly Sins, 1952) – Eduardo (segment "Avarice et la colère, L' / Avarice and Anger")Altri tempi (1952)Five Paupers in an Automobile (1952) – Eduardo MoschettoneRagazze da marito (Girls to be married, 1952) – Oreste Mazzillo
 Husband and Wife (1952) – Matteo Cuomo / Gennaro ImparatoNapoletani a Milano (Neapolitans in Milan, 1953) – Salvatore AianelloTraviata '53 (1953) – Commendator CesatiIt Happened in the Park (1953) – Donato Ventrella (segment: Il paraninfo)100 Years of Love (1954) – Soldier Vincenzo Pagliaro (segment "Purificazione")Tempi nostri (1954) – Il conduttoreQuesti fantasmi (These Ghosts, 1954)The Gold of Naples (1954) – Don Ersilio Miccio (segment "Il professore")Cortile (1955) – LuigiLa canzone del destino (1957)Fortunella (Happy-go-lucky Girl, 1958) – Head of the Theater CompanyL'amore più bello (1958) – Gennaro EspositoRaw Wind in Eden (1958) – Urbano VarnoFerdinando I, re di Napoli (1959) – PulcinellaIl sogno di una notte di mezza sbornia (A Midsummer's Hangover Dream, 1959) – Pasquale GrifoneEverybody Go Home (1960) – Signor InnocenziGhosts of Rome (1961) – Don Annibale, Principe di RovianoThe Shortest Day (1963) – MafiosoOggi, domani, dopodomani (Today, Tomorrow and the Day After, 1965) – Driver (segment "L'uomo dei 5 palloni")Spara più forte, più forte... non capisco (Shoot louder, I can't hear You, 1966) – Zi NicolaGhosts – Italian Style (1966)The Canterbury Tales'' – voice of the old man in the Pardoner's Tale

References

External links 

Site dedicated to his life and works (in Italian)
 
 
 

1900 births
1984 deaths
Male actors from Naples
Italian male stage actors
20th-century Italian screenwriters
Italian film directors
Italian male poets
Italian dramatists and playwrights
Italian life senators
20th-century Italian male actors
20th-century Italian poets
20th-century Italian dramatists and playwrights
Italian male dramatists and playwrights
20th-century Italian male writers
Italian male screenwriters
Writers from Naples